Sam FM may refer to:

 S.A.M.: Simply About Music, a 24-hour satellite-driven format produced by Westwood One
 Sam FM (South Coast), an adult hits format radio station broadcasting to a stretch of the English South Coast
 Sam FM (Bristol), an English language adult hits format radio station in Bristol, United Kingdom
 Sam FM (Swindon), a local radio station in Swindon, United Kingdom